Niguza is a genus of moths of the family Erebidae. The genus was erected by Francis Walker in 1858.

Species
 Niguza anisogramma Lower, 1905
 Niguza eucesta (Turner, 1903)
 Niguza habroscopa Lower, 1915
 Niguza oculita Swinhoe, 1901
 Niguza spiramioides Walker, 1858

References

Catocalini
Noctuoidea genera